Grigor Dolapchiev (born 23 February 1994) is a Bulgarian footballer who plays as a forward for Minyor Pernik.

Club career
Dolapchiev joined the CSKA Academy at the age of nine in 2003.

He made his senior debut on 31 August 2012, at the age of 18, coming on as a substitute for Stanko Yovchev in a 4–1 victory over Minyor Pernik. On 15 December, Dolapchiev came off the bench to score his first senior goal for the club in a 5–0 Bulgarian Cup win against Chavdar Etropole. In mid July 2013, following a change in the club's ownership, he signed his first professional contract with CSKA Sofia. On 29 July 2013, Dolapchiev scored an equalizing goal against Beroe in an A PFG match shortly after coming on as a substitute. On 19 October 2013, he made his first appearance in The Eternal Derby of Bulgaria after coming on as a late second half substitute in the 3:0 home win over Levski Sofia.

After a loan spell at Horizont Turnovo, Dolapchiev rejoined CSKA Sofia in December 2014. However, in January 2015 he was loaned out to Haskovo until the end of the A PFG season. He subsequently returned to CSKA Sofia once again to play for the team in the third division of Bulgarian football, but was eventually released by Hristo Yanev and moved to Oborishte in the B PFG.  In January 2016, Dolapchiev signed for Spartak Pleven.  On 25 April 2017, he terminated his contract due to unpaid wages.

On 20 June 2017, Dolapchiev signed with Vitosha Bistritsa. On 21 July 2017, he scored the first ever goal in the top division for the "tigers" from Bistritsa, finding the net in the 1:1 draw with Etar Veliko Tarnovo.

International career
In August 2013, Dolapchiev earned his first call-up to the Bulgaria U21 national side, but did not debut.

Statistics
As of 26 September 2019

References

External links
 
 

1994 births
Living people
Bulgarian footballers
Bulgaria youth international footballers
First Professional Football League (Bulgaria) players
PFC CSKA Sofia players
FK Horizont Turnovo players
FC Haskovo players
FC Oborishte players
PFC Spartak Pleven players
FC Vitosha Bistritsa players
FC Dunav Ruse players
FC Sportist Svoge players
Expatriate footballers in North Macedonia
Footballers from Sofia
Association football forwards
Bulgarian expatriates in North Macedonia